The Schleicher Condor, also referred to as the Dittmar Condor,  is a series of German high-wing, single and two-seat, gull winged, gliders that were designed by Heini Dittmar in the 1930s, produced in small quantities before the Second World War, produced again between 1952 and 1955 by Alexander Schleicher GmbH & Co and also by Ferdinand Schmetz.

Design and development
The first Condor I was introduced in 1932. The aircraft was further developed into the Condor II and the IIA, which replaced strut bracing with a cantilever wing. Following the Second World War the two-seat Condor IV first flew in 1951 and was put into series production by Schleicher.

The Condor series was built from wood, with the wooden-framed wing covered in doped aircraft fabric. The Condor IV has a  span wing that employs a Goettingen 532 airfoil at the wing root, changing to a NACA 0012 section at the wing tip. The wings have balanced DFS-style dive brakes for glidepath control. The horizontal stabilizer is of an all-flying tail design. The landing gear was originally a dolly for take-off, with the aircraft landing on a fixed skid, although at least one was modified to use a fixed monowheel.

Some sources state that there were a total of 18 Condors constructed, while one other says that the total number is unknown, but includes at least 18 Condor IVs built under licence in Argentina.

At least one Condor was converted to a motorglider.

Operational history
The Condor design was a record-setter from its earliest flights in the 1930s. Condor IVs were flown in the 1952 World Gliding Championships held in Madrid, Spain.

Hans Luenger imported one Condor IV-2 to the United States in 1952. After the wooden fuselage was damaged he built a new design replacement from welded steel tube and covered it with doped fabric. The new fuselage included a fixed wheel for landing gear. This aircraft was removed from the US Federal Aviation Administration registry in 2007.

Variants
Condor I
Initial strut-braced, single-seat version introduced in 1932.
Condor II
Improved strut-braced, single-seat version.
Condor IIB
Improved cantilever wing, single-seat version.
Condor IV
Post war two-seat version with a cantilever wing.
Dittmar-Reidel Motor-Condor Peter Reidel's Condor La Falda was modified to have a strut-mounted power-egg, containing a Kroeber M4 driving a pusher propeller, attached to the centre-section. The intention was for the power-egg to be carried to the glider by the retrieve crew, fitted to the glider and the pilot to fly the glider back to home base without the need to de-rig and transport by trailer. In practice it was found to be impractical due to the complexity of the mounting, as well as time and effort required to mount the power-egg.

Aircraft on display

Deutsches Museum Flugwerft Schleissheim

Specifications (Condor IV-2)

See also

References

External links

1930s German sailplanes
Schleicher aircraft
Aircraft first flown in 1932
High-wing aircraft
Gull-wing aircraft